Louchuan (traditional Chinese: , simplified: , pinyin: lóuchuán, lit. tower ships) were a type of Chinese naval vessels, primarily a floating fortress, which have seen use since the Han dynasty. Meant to be a central vessel in the fleet, the louchuan was equipped for boarding and attacking enemy vessels, as well as with siege weapons including traction trebuchets for ranged combat.

Description
Historical records relating to the louchuan are found in sources such as the Song dynasty military treatise Wujing Zongyao, written during the Song dynasty, and the Taibai Yinjing from the Tang dynasty. From the latter (as translated by British biochemist, sinologist, and historian Joseph Needham), the tower ships were described as:

The use of such ships in riverine warfare, especially along the Chang Jiang, stretches back to the late Han dynasty, and perhaps even earlier.

See also
Naval history of China
Battle of Lake Poyang

References

Chinese inventions
Military history of the Han dynasty
Naval ships of China